On the Verge of Insanity is a 2021 South Korean television series starring Jung Jae-young, Moon So-ri, Lee Sang-yeob and Kim Ga-eun. It aired on MBC TV from June 23 to August 26, 2021 for 16 episodes.

Synopsis
It follows the story of middle-aged office workers struggling to survive in a turbulent workplace.

Cast

Main
 Jung Jae-young as Choi Ban-seok, a developer in the home appliance division of Hanmyung Electronics. Although he is a veteran engineer, he ends up joining the HR team after a series of ups and downs.
 Moon So-ri as Dang Ja-young, the workaholic head of HR team who is respected by her juniors for her outstanding leadership and is trusted by her superiors for her mental agility.
 Lee Sang-yeob as Han Se-kwon, the development team leader who is related to the company group's owner.
 Kim Ga-eun as Seo Na-ri, the deputy of the planning team.

Supporting

People in research building
 Kim Nam-hee as Shin Han-soo
 Ahn Nae-sang as Noh Byung-guk
  as Gong Jung-pil
 Park Won-sang as Peng Su-gon
  as Ki Jung-hyun
 Baek Min-hyun as Ahn Jun-soo
  as Go Jung-sik
  as Pyun Dong-il

People in office building
 Cha Chung-hwa as Kim Jung-ah
  as So Sang-wook
  as Gye Bo-ram
  as Bae Jung-tak
  as Oh Jae-il

People in headquarters
  as Han Seung-gi
 Kang Ju-sang as Noh Jae-yeol
 Kang Yeon-woo as Park Hoon-jung

Extended
 Jung Sung-hoon as Yoon Gi-joon
 Kim Yoon-seo as Jung Sung-eun
 Kim Ye-eun as Oh Hye-yeon
 Jung Yeo-jun as Gil Chang-hwan
 Yoo Jung-rae as Eo Hae-mi
 Kim Seon-ah as Kim Seul-ah
 Oh Yu-na as Heo Ga-young

Production
The first script reading of the cast was held at Changwon International Hotel. The series is set in South Gyeongsang Province and cast a large number of locals from that area in minor roles.

References

External links
  
 
 

MBC TV television dramas
Korean-language television shows
2021 South Korean television series debuts
2021 South Korean television series endings
South Korean comedy television series
South Korean workplace television series
Television series by IWill Media